The 56th edition of the Women's World Allround Speed Skating Championships was held on 3 and 4 March 1995 at the Savalen kunstisbane in Savalen, Norway.

26 speed skaters from 14 countries participated. It was the final edition held separately for women. From 1996 onward the men's and women's World Allround Speed Skating Championships would be combined into a single tournament.

Gunda Niemann won the world title ahead of Lyudmila Prokasheva and Annamarie Thomas. It was her fourth world title after 1991, 1992 and 1993.

Distance medals

Standings

See also
1995 Men's World Allround Speed Skating Championships

References

External links
Results on SpeedSkatingNews

1995 World Allround
World Allround Speed Skating Championships
World Allround. 1995